Nicholas Young (born March 3, 1982) is a Canadian former competitive figure skater. He is the 2003 Nebelhorn Trophy champion, a two-time Karl Schäfer Memorial bronze medallist, and a medallist at three ISU Junior Grand Prix events. He competed at three World Junior Championship, achieving his best result, seventh, in 2002.

Young studied political science at Concordia University. He married Mylène Brodeur in June 2010.

Programs

Competitive highlights
GP: Grand Prix; JGP: Junior Grand Prix

References

External links
 Official site
 
 

1982 births
Canadian male single skaters
Living people
Sportspeople from Pembroke, Ontario
Competitors at the 2003 Winter Universiade
20th-century Canadian people
21st-century Canadian people